Rask (also romanized as Rāsak and Rāzk) is a city in and the capital of Sarbaz County, Sistan and Baluchestan Province, Iran. At the 2006 census, its population was 5,931, in 1,102 families.

Rask is located in the Sarbaz Mountains and beside the Sarbaz River. A road passing through Rask links Chabahar Port to the national road network of Iran.

References

Cities in Sistan and Baluchestan Province